Leichhardt was an electoral district, located in the colony of New South Wales, Australia, and part of the New South Wales Legislative Assembly. The district was created for the July 1859 election, partly replacing the United Pastoral Districts of Moreton, Wide Bay, Burnett, Maranoa, Leichhardt and Port Curtis in the present day central Queensland. It included the towns of Rockhampton and Emerald, the pastoral districts around the Leichhardt River in the Gulf of Carpentaria region and Port Curtis (Gladstone). It was abolished in December 1859 as a result of the separation of Queensland.

The district is one of 4 seats named after Ludwig Leichhardt. The Legislative Assembly of Queensland was established in 1860 and the central Queensland area continued to be part of a district named Leichhardt, until that district was abolished in 1932. New South Wales created the Electoral district of Leichhardt, based on the eponymous suburb in Sydney. The division of Leichhardt, a seat in the Australian House of Representatives was created in 1949.

Members for Leichhardt

Election results

Elections in the 1850s

1859

References

Former electoral districts of New South Wales
Electoral districts of New South Wales in the area of Queensland
History of Queensland
Constituencies established in 1859
Constituencies disestablished in 1859
1859 establishments in Australia
1859 disestablishments in Australia